Torquil Mathewson is a Scottish former rugby union player who played for Glasgow Warriors at the Wing positions.

Mathewson played for Glasgow University RFC before moving on to Glasgow Academicals RFC. He was part of Glasgow Academicals squad to go to Zimbabwe Victoria Tens tournament. In 1995 he played for the amateur Glasgow District side.

Mathewson played for Glasgow Warriors at the start of the 1999-2000 season. He played in all of Glasgow's pre-season matches that year; scoring a try against Ulster Rugby in the first match and playing in their Canadian tour where he played Ontario, Uruguay A and Edinburgh Reivers.

However he did not receive a contract with Glasgow and played no competitive matches for the club. After the rejection by Glasgow, Mathewson had a trial lined up with Bath Rugby. However that was delayed and Mathewson played for Glasgow Hawks.

In 2003, Mathewson signed for Watsonians.

Leaving rugby, Mathewson was a property developer, a furniture manufacturer, and a marketing consultant.

References

Living people
Scottish rugby union players
Glasgow Warriors players
Glasgow Hawks players
Glasgow Academicals rugby union players
Watsonians RFC players
Glasgow University RFC players
Glasgow District (rugby union) players
Year of birth missing (living people)
Rugby union players from Edinburgh
Rugby union wings